Save Me from Myself is an autobiography by Brian "Head" Welch.

Save Me from Myself may also refer to:

Music

Albums 
Save Me from Myself (album), an album by Brian "Head" Welch, and the title song

Songs 
"Save Me from Myself", a song by Brian "Head" Welch from the album of the same name
"Save Me from Myself", a song by Carpark North from Grateful
"Save Me from Myself", a song by Christina Aguilera from Back to Basics
"Save Me from Myself", a song by FFS from the self-titled album
"Save Me from Myself", a song by Gregg Alexander from Michigan Rain
"Save Me from Myself", a song by Michael Hutchence from the self-titled album
"Save Me from Myself", a song by Michael W. Smith from Wonder
"Save Me from Myself", a song by rock band Orange Goblin from the album A Eulogy for the Damned
"Save Me from Myself", a song by Ray Stevens from Feel the Music
"Save Me from Myself", a song by Sirenia from An Elixir for Existence
"Save Me (From Myself)", a song by Steve Harley & Cockney Rebel from The Quality of Mercy
"Save Me from Myself", a song by Tara Newley, 1994
"Save Me from Myself", a song by Terry Ronald from Roma
"Save Me from Myself", a song by Vertical Horizon from Burning the Days
"Save Me from Myself (Encore)", a song by Hanson from Anthem

See also 
 Save Me (disambiguation)